F60 or F.60 may refer to:

Vehicles

Cars
 Ferrari F60, Ferrari's Formula One racing car for the 2009 season
 Ferrari F60 America, a limited production roadster derivative of the Ferrari F12 unveiled in 2014
 Enzo Ferrari (car), a Ferrari supercar sometimes referred to as the F60
 Second Generation Mini Countryman, codenamed F60

Aeroplanes
 Farman F.60 Goliath, a 1919 French airliner 
 Shenyang F60, a Chinese mid-size fifth generation fighter

Other uses
 Nikon F60, an entry-level autofocus 35mm film SLR camera
 Overburden Conveyor Bridge F60, a piece of machinery used in mining